All About Animals is an Australian television series. It is a show about all types of animals including Australian native animals, exotic animals and pets. The show is hosted by 9-year-old Olivia Todd and her 15-year-old brother, Jake. Together they travel to a range of animal sanctuaries, zoos and wildlife parks to learn interesting things about different animals. They also interview a range of celebrities who love animals or are representatives of different wildlife organisations.

The key messages Olivia and Jake aim to communicate are about responsible pet ownership as well as animal welfare and conservation. The show is filmed in different parts of Australia.

The show is currently broadcast across Australia and New Zealand.

Networks
 Southern Cross Television
 C31 Melbourne
 Television Sydney
 44 Adelaide
 31 Brisbane
 West TV
 Triangle Stratos

Crew

References

External links 
 All About Animals website
 About Animals Facebook
 About Animals YouTube channel

Australian children's television series